The 2016–17 CBA season is the 22nd season of the Chinese Basketball Association.

The regular season began on Saturday, October 29, 2016, with the defending champion Sichuan Blue Whales hosting the Beikong Fly Dragons.

The regular season ends on Sunday, February 19, 2017, and the playoffs begin on Friday, February 24, 2017.

Team Changes 
One team relocated ahead of the season.

Name Changes 
The Foshan Long-Lions moved to Guangzhou and changed their name to Guangzhou Long-Lions on September 23, 2016.

Foreign Players Policy
All teams except the Bayi Rockets can have two foreign players. The bottom 4 teams from the previous season (except Bayi) have the additional right to sign an extra Asian player.

Rules Chart
The rules for using foreign players in each game are described in this chart:

+ Including players from Hong Kong and Taiwan.

++ If a team waives its right to sign an extra Asian player, it may use its 2 foreign players for 7 quarters collectively.

+++ Only 1 allowed in the 4th quarter.

Import Chart
This is the full list of international players who competed in the CBA during the 2016-17 season.

Regular Season Standings

Playoffs

The 2017 CBA Playoffs began on February 24 and ended on April 7, 2017.

References

External links
CBA Official Website
CBA China - 2016-17 Standings and Stats on Basketball-Reference.com

 
League
Chinese Basketball Association seasons
CBA